North Ocean Shipping Co. Ltd. v. Hyundai Construction Co., Ltd. [1979] QB 705 is an English contract law case relating to duress.

Facts
Hyundai were shipbuilders who entered into a contract dated 10 April 1972 with North Ocean Shipping to build the oil tanker "Atlantic Baron". The price of ships was payable in five instalments, and the builders had agreed to a reverse letter of credit, for repayment of installments in the event of default on the construction. In 1973, after the first instalment was paid for a ship called the Atlantic Baron, the US dollar was devalued. Hyundai said they would not deliver unless the price went up ten per cent. North Ocean was worried they would lose a favourable charter with Shell. They said they would pay the extra money in a telex on 28 June 1973 because they wished ‘to maintain an amicable relationship and without prejudice to our rights.’ North Ocean also asked for the letter of credit to contain a corresponding increase and this was done.

The ship was subsequently delivered to North Ocean on 27 November 1974, and later on 30 July 1975 they first referred the matter to legal action, which was via arbitration.

Judgment
Mocatta J held that "preserving amicable relations" was not good consideration, but that increasing the letter of credit price was good consideration. He then asked if the whole agreement was procured by duress for the threat to break the original agreement. He noted ‘the best known case’ of Maskell v Horner, and also Skeate v Beale, where Lord Denman CJ said an agreement was not void because it was made under duress of goods, but noted that older cases do not deal with what happens when the threat is to breach a contract. He decided that there was such a thing as economic duress, a threat to break a contract is one form and if it led to a contract for valuable consideration ‘I think that contract is a voidable one which can be avoided and the excess money paid under it recovered.’ The agreement here was caused by ‘economic duress’. ‘The owners made a very reasonable offer of arbitration coupled with security for any award in the yard’s favour that might be made, but this was refused… I do not consider the yard’s ignorance of the Shell charter material. It may well be that had they known of it they would have been even more exigent.’ However, because of the 8 month delay in bringing the case to court, economic duress could not be found in this case: 'the action and inaction of the owners can only be regarded as an affirmation of the variation.'

See also

English contract law
Lloyds Bank Ltd. v. Bundy [1975] QB 326
Williams v. Walker-Thomas Furniture Co. 350 F.2d 445 (C.A. D.C. 1965)
Atlas Express Ltd v Kafco [1989] QB 833

Notes

References

English unconscionability case law
English duress case law
High Court of Justice cases
1979 in case law
1979 in British law
Hyundai